The 1987 Masters Tournament was the 51st Masters Tournament, held April 9−12 at Augusta National Golf Club in Augusta, Georgia. Augusta native Larry Mize won his only major championship in a sudden-death playoff over Seve Ballesteros and Greg Norman. Norman had barely missed a  birdie opportunity on the 72nd hole which would have won him the tournament in regulation.

The playoff began on the par-4 10th hole, where the approach shots of Ballesteros and Norman came to rest on the fringe, and Mize's was on the green, below the hole. Ballesteros failed to par and was eliminated while Norman two-putted for four. Mize's uphill birdie putt came up short and he tapped in to continue with Norman. Norman then played conservatively to the right fringe, with a  putt, sensing a par could win the green jacket. But Mize chipped in for an improbable birdie 3 and a stunned Norman failed to hole his to tie, which ended the  Mize was the first, and only winner of the Masters to come from Augusta.

It was considered one of the most miraculous shots (and endings) in major championship history, and was just one of the many "bad breaks" in Norman's career.

Field
1. Masters champions
Tommy Aaron, Seve Ballesteros (3,8), Gay Brewer, Billy Casper, Charles Coody, Ben Crenshaw (8,9,11,12), Raymond Floyd (2,4,9,11,12,13), Doug Ford, Bernhard Langer (8,9,12), Jack Nicklaus (8,9), Arnold Palmer, Gary Player, Craig Stadler (9,13), Art Wall Jr., Tom Watson (2,3,8,12), Fuzzy Zoeller (2,8,9,11,12,13)

George Archer, Jack Burke Jr., Bob Goalby, Ralph Guldahl, Claude Harmon, Ben Hogan, Herman Keiser, Cary Middlecoff, Byron Nelson, Henry Picard, Gene Sarazen, and Sam Snead did not play.

2. U.S. Open champions (last five years)
Larry Nelson, Andy North (13)

3. The Open champions (last five years)
Sandy Lyle (8,11), Greg Norman (8,9,10,11,12)

4. PGA champions (last five years)
Hubert Green (13), Hal Sutton (9,11,12,13), Lee Trevino (9), Bob Tway (8,9,10,11,12)

5. 1986 U.S. Amateur semi-finalists
Buddy Alexander (6,7,a), Chris Kite (a), Bob Lewis (7,a), Brian Montgomery (a)

6. Previous two U.S. Amateur and Amateur champions
David Curry (a), Garth McGimpsey (a)

Sam Randolph forfeited his exemption by turning professional.

7. Members of the 1986 U.S. Eisenhower Trophy team
Billy Andrade (a), Jay Sigel (a)

8. Top 24 players and ties from the 1986 Masters Tournament
Dave Barr, Chen Tze-chung (11), Jay Haas, Donnie Hammond (12), Tom Kite (11,12,13), Gary Koch (9), Roger Maltbie, Mark McCumber (9), Larry Mize (12), Tsuneyuki Nakajima, Corey Pavin (11,12), Calvin Peete (12,13), Nick Price, Payne Stewart (9,10,11,12), Curtis Strange (11,13)

9. Top 16 players and ties from the 1986 U.S. Open
Chip Beck, Mark Calcavecchia (11), David Frost, David Graham (10), Jodie Mudd, Joey Sindelar (12), Scott Verplank, Bobby Wadkins (12), Lanny Wadkins (11,143), Denis Watson

10. Top eight players and ties from 1986 PGA Championship
Mike Hulbert (11,12), Bruce Lietzke, Jim Thorpe (11,12), D. A. Weibring

Peter Jacobsen (13) did not play.

11. Winners of PGA Tour events since the previous Masters
Paul Azinger (12), Andy Bean (12), George Burns, Rick Fehr, Ernie Gonzalez, Ken Green (12), Johnny Miller, Bob Murphy, Mac O'Grady (12), Dan Pohl (12), Gene Sauers, Scott Simpson, Fred Wadsworth, Mark Wiebe (12)

12. Top 30 players from the 1986 PGA Tour money list
John Cook, Kenny Knox, John Mahaffey, Mark O'Meara (13), Don Pooley, Doug Tewell

13. Members of the U.S. 1985 Ryder Cup team

14. Special foreign invitation
Isao Aoki, Howard Clark, José María Olazábal, Masashi Ozaki

Round summaries

First round
Thursday, April 9, 1987

Source:

Second round
Friday, April 10, 1987

Source:

Third round
Saturday, April 11, 1987

Source:

Final round
Sunday, April 12, 1987

Final leaderboard

Sources:

Scorecard

Cumulative tournament scores, relative to par
{|class="wikitable" span = 50 style="font-size:85%;
|-
|style="background: Pink;" width=10|
|Birdie
|style="background: PaleGreen;" width=10|
|Bogey
|style="background: Green;" width=10|
|Double bogey
|}
Source:

Playoff

Sudden-death playoff began on hole #10 and ended at hole #11, where Mize birdied.

References

External links
Masters.com – past winners and results
Augusta.com – 1987 Masters leaderboard and scorecards
YouTube.com − video − 1987 Masters playoff highlights
YouTube.com − video − 1987 Masters playoff-winning shot, from CBS Sports

1987
1987 in golf
1987 in American sports
1987 in sports in Georgia (U.S. state)
April 1987 sports events in the United States